The Mouse from H.U.N.G.E.R. is a 1967 Tom and Jerry short directed by Abe Levitow and produced by Chuck Jones. The title's a pun on The Man from U.N.C.L.E.. Tom Thrush is a parody of Turk Thrust from A Shot in the Dark. It also references THRUSH, the enemy of U.N.C.L.E.

Plot
Jerry, a secret agent, drives a micro dragster through the street of a town (the buildings in the opening shot suggest Westminster, London) and enters his secret headquarters through a cigar store Indian. His mission is to infiltrate the mansion of Tom Thrush and recover a refrigerator with a large amount of cheese. Before taking the operation out, he checks all of the weapons inside his coat. But when he tightens the belt, they fire, creating several holes on the coat as he comically grins at the "audience".

After the opening credits, Tom (with a noticeable gap in his front teeth in this cartoon, similar to Terry-Thomas) sets some traps for Jerry, including an exploding robot female mouse, as he drives to Tom's mansion, outside of the city. These prove mostly ineffective at stopping Jerry. Tom manages to reach the safeguarded room and sets even more traps, such as mines, blades, cannons, and barbed wire. Jerry plays a tape-recorder; it sounds as if he is walking through the room. Tom waits a few seconds, then says "Boom!" Not hearing the explosions that should result from the walking, Tom runs  in and gets attacked by his own traps as a result.

After that, Tom "helps" Jerry by opening the safe that keeps the refrigerator as he has lost his sanity and self-control (due to the traps that he ran over). Jerry thanks Tom by lifting his fedora up as he now has the refrigerator. Jerry straps the refrigerator to his micro-dragster and Tom crawls out the front door, in a very bad way following the incident. His hand lands on the "Play" button of Jerry's tape player, and the song "Taps" starts to play. Tom picks a flower and lays it on his chest, indicating that he is dying from the incident. The words "THE END" are seen on Jerry's number plate ("JERRY-AKIN 00 1/7", a pun on both Illya Kuryakin and James Bond) before Jerry drives off.

Crew
Animation: Philip Roman, Ben Washam, Ken Harris, Don Towsley, Tom Ray & Dick Thompson
Layouts: Don Morgan
Backgrounds: Bob Inman
Design Consultant: Maurice Noble
Vocal Effects: Mel Blanc & June Foray
Production Manager: Earl Jonas
Story: Bob Ogle
Music: Dean Elliott
Graphics: Don Foster
Production Supervised by Les Goldman
Produced by Chuck Jones
Directed by Abe Levitow

References

External links

1967 films
1967 short films
1967 animated films
Films directed by Abe Levitow
Tom and Jerry short films
1960s American animated films
Animated films without speech
Films scored by Dean Elliott
1960s spy comedy films
American spy comedy films
Metro-Goldwyn-Mayer short films
Metro-Goldwyn-Mayer animated short films
1967 comedy films
MGM Animation/Visual Arts short films
1960s English-language films